The  Detroit Lions season was the franchise's 86th season in the National Football League, their 82nd as the Detroit Lions and the second under Head Coach Jim Caldwell. By Week 7 of the season, the Lions had already lost six games, more than they did in the entire 2014 season. This led to the firing of Offensive Coordinator Joe Lombardi and two other coaches. After falling to 1–7 the following week, the team fired President Tom Lewand and General Manager Martin Mayhew. On November 19, the Lions named Rod Wood as team President. The Lions were eliminated from playoff contention after their loss to St. Louis in week 14. The team had a 6–2 record in the second half of the season to finish at 7–9, good for third place in the NFC North. One highlight of the season was the Lions first win in Green Bay since 1991.

Offseason

Re-signings

Arrivals

Departures

Trades
 On March 10, the Lions traded their fourth and fifth-round picks to the Baltimore Ravens in exchange for defensive tackle Haloti Ngata and a seventh-round pick.
 On April 15, the Lions traded defensive end George Johnson and a seventh-round pick to the Tampa Bay Buccaneers in exchange for a fifth-round pick.
 On August 3, the Lions traded Mohammed Seisay to the Seattle Seahawks in exchange for a sixth-round pick in the 2016 NFL draft.

Draft

Notes
 The Lions traded their fourth and fifth-round selections (Nos. 122 and 158 overall, respectively) to the Baltimore Ravens in exchange for defensive tackle Haloti Ngata and the Ravens' seventh-round selection (No. 231 overall).
 The Lions traded defensive end George Johnson and their seventh-round selection (No. 231 overall) to the Tampa Bay Buccaneers in exchange for a fifth-round selection (No. 168 overall).
 The Lions traded their first-round selection (No. 23 overall) to the Denver Broncos in exchange for Denver's 2015 first and fifth-round selections (Nos. 28 and 143 overall, respectively), their fifth-round selection in the 2016 NFL draft, and guard Manny Ramirez.
 The Lions traded their third and fifth-round selections (Nos. 88 and 143 overall, respectively) to the Minnesota Vikings in exchange for a third-round selection (No. 80 overall).
 The Lions traded their third-round selection in the 2016 NFL draft to the Philadelphia Eagles in exchange for a fourth-round selection (No. 113 overall).

Final roster

Schedule

Preseason

Regular season

Note: Intra-division opponents are in bold text.

Game summaries

Week 1: at San Diego Chargers

The visiting Lions opened the 2015 season at San Diego. Detroit held a 21–3 lead midway through the second quarter, only to see the Chargers reel off 30 unanswered points on their way to a 33–28 victory.

Week 2: at Minnesota Vikings

The Vikings took an early 14–0 lead on the visiting Lions and never looked back, as Detroit struggled to find any offensive consistency, especially in the running game. (Quarterback Matthew Stafford was the leading rusher with only 20 yards.)

Week 3: vs. Denver Broncos

Playing in their home debut, the 0–2 Lions closed the game to 14–12 in the third quarter, but a two-point conversion to tie the score failed. Denver then scored the final 10 points for a 24–12 victory.

Week 4: at Seattle Seahawks

Playing on Monday Night, the Lions had a chance to upset last year's NFC Champion Seattle Seahawks. Late in the fourth quarter, Calvin Johnson caught a pass from Matthew Stafford and was headed for a go-ahead touchdown until Kam Chancellor punched the ball from his hands at Seattle's 1-yard line. As the ball bounded into the end zone, K. J. Wright batted the ball across the end line. By NFL rules, the intentional guiding of the ball across the end line should have resulted in a penalty, giving the ball back to the Lions at the spot of the fumble. But the back judge ruled that Wright's act was not blatant, and Seattle was given the ball at their own 20-yard line, after which they proceeded to run out the clock.

Dean Blandino, NFL VP of Officiating, stated after the game that the on-field officials made a mistake, and Detroit should have regained possession at the 1-yard line.

With the loss, the Lions are 0–4, their worst start since 2010. With the Saints' win over the Cowboys on Sunday Night, the Lions are the league's only winless team.

Week 5: vs. Arizona Cardinals

The highlight of the game was when Calvin Johnson caught his 671st pass with the Lions, breaking Herman Moore's franchise record. Inconsistent play by Matthew Stafford, including throwing 3 interceptions, forced him to the sidelines for the game's remainder. With the blowout loss, the Lions remained winless at 0–5.

This marks the first time the Lions have started a season 0–5 since 2008 (when they went 0-16).

Week 6: vs. Chicago Bears

With an overtime victory over the visiting Chicago Bears, the Detroit Lions are no longer winless, improving to 1–5. A 57-yard bomb from Matthew Stafford to Calvin Johnson with under three minutes to play in overtime set up Matt Prater for the game-winning 27-yard field goal.

Week 7: vs. Minnesota Vikings

Despite leading 17–15 at halftime, the Lions only managed to score 2 more points the rest of the game on an intentional safety taken by the Vikings in the closing seconds, losing 28–19 and dropping to 1–6. Quarterback Matthew Stafford was hit 13 times and sacked 7 times. The next day, the Lions fired offensive coordinator Joe Lombardi, offensive line coach Jeremiah Washburn and assistant offensive line coach Terry Heffernan. Quarterbacks coach Jim Bob Cooter will take over as offensive coordinator, tight ends coach Ron Prince takes over for Washburn, and special teams assistant Devin Fitzsimmons takes over as the new tight ends coach.

Week 8: at Kansas City Chiefs

After the blowout overseas loss, the Lions entered their bye week at 1–7, the NFL's worst record so far this season. Despite the changeover in offensive coaches, Matthew Stafford was sacked six more times. On November 5, the Lions fired President Tom Lewand and General Manager Martin Mayhew. Former vice president of pro personnel Sheldon White will serve as the team's interim general manager.

Week 10: at Green Bay Packers

The 1–7 Lions withstood a late rally to earn an upset win over the 6–2 Packers. This was the first Lions win over Green Bay in Wisconsin since 1991. Ameer Abdullah set up the Lions first touchdown when he returned a kickoff 104 yards, and was stopped at the one-yard line. This tied the record set by Percy Harvin in 2011 for the longest non-scoring play in NFL history.

Week 11: vs. Oakland Raiders

The 18–13 win over the visiting Raiders gave the Lions their first back–to–back victories of the season. The Lions became the first team in NFL history to score exactly 18 points in consecutive games.

Week 12: vs. Philadelphia Eagles
Thanksgiving Day game

Celebrating their 76th Thanksgiving Day game, the Lions routed the Eagles for their third consecutive win. Matthew Stafford threw five touchdown passes, three of them to Calvin Johnson. Having lost at Ford Field for the first time, the Eagles dropped to 6–1 when playing on Thanksgiving.

Week 13: vs. Green Bay Packers

Despite the Lions leading the entire game, the Packers won the game after the official clock expired when a controversial facemask penalty against Devin Taylor gave them one extra untimed play. On that play, Aaron Rodgers threw a 61-yard Hail Mary pass to Richard Rodgers for the winning touchdown. The play was later dubbed the "Miracle in Motown".

Week 14: at St. Louis Rams

After a scoreless first quarter against the Rams in St. Louis, the Lions' attempt at a comeback in the second half fell short. The ninth loss guaranteed a losing season, the team's third in the last four years, and officially eliminated the Lions from playoff contention.

Week 15: at New Orleans Saints

The Lions defeated the Saints 35–27, as Matthew Stafford posted a single-game career high in passer rating (148.6), and broke Jon Kitna's single-game franchise record with an 88.0 completion percentage (22-for-25). It was the team's first road win over the Saints since 2005.

Week 16: vs. San Francisco 49ers

After multiple lead changes and a close halftime score, the Lions pulled away and won their last home game of the season, keeping the 49ers scoreless for the entire second half. Theo Riddick caught 7 passes for 63 yards, giving him 668 receiving yards on the season, a Lions franchise record for a running back.

Week 17: at Chicago Bears

The Lions completed a season sweep of their division rival Chicago Bears with a 24–20 win. The loss sunk the Bears to last place in the NFC North, with the Lions finishing third. Matthew Stafford completed 28 of 39 passes, giving him a season completion percentage of 67.2, the best for a quarterback in franchise history. Theo Riddick caught 4 passes for 29 yards, giving him season totals of 80 receptions and 697 yards, both franchise records for a running back. The Lions finished the season with three players catching 80 passes or more – Golden Tate (90), Calvin Johnson (88) and Riddick (80) – a first for any Lions team. Matt Prater kicked a 59-yard field goal in the game, the longest in Lions franchise history and the longest ever kicked at Soldier Field.

Standings

Division

Conference

Staff

References

External links
 

Detroit
Detroit Lions seasons
Detroit Lions